Ralph Elihu Becker Sr. (January 29, 1907 – August 24, 1994) was an American diplomat and attorney who served as U.S. Ambassador to Honduras from 1976–1977 under the Ford administration. He was a founding trustee of the National Center for the Performing Arts and served as its general counsel during the Eisenhower administration and until 1976.

Early life and education 
Ralph Becker was born on January 29, 1907, in New York City, to a tailor from Lithuania and a mother from Minsk. He took night courses at the City College of New York earned his law degree from St. John's University law school in 1928.

Career 
He served in the Judge Advocate General's Corps in World War II as a part of the 30th Infantry Division. He landed in Normandy after D-Day and won a Bronze Star, along with medals from the Belgian, French, and Dutch governments.

After his discharge, he worked as a lawyer in Westchester County, New York. He went to Washington, D. C. and was the chairman for the Young Republican National Committee from 1946 to 1950. In the 1960s, he joined an Arctic expedition that he had helped sponsor, and brought back a pair of polar bears as a gift for the National Zoo in Washington, D.C. From 1976 to 1977, he was appointed Ambassador to Honduras.

Personal life 
Becker died of congestive heart failure at the George Washington University Hospital on August 24, 1994. He was interred soon afterwards in Arlington National Cemetery.

His son Ralph Elihu Becker Jr. was elected Mayor of Salt Lake City, Utah in 2007.

See also
 List of Chairpersons of the College Republicans

References

External links
 Papers of Ralph Becker, Dwight D. Eisenhower Presidential Library

1907 births
1994 deaths
American people of Lithuanian descent
American people of Belarusian descent
Ambassadors of the United States to Honduras
Burials at Arlington National Cemetery
United States Army personnel of World War II
United States Army officers
College Republican National Committee chairs
Politicians from New York City
St. John's University School of Law alumni